The following lists events that happened during 2017 in Laos.

Incumbents
Party General Secretary: Bounnhang Vorachith
President: Bounnhang Vorachith
Prime Minister: Thongloun Sisoulith
Vice President: Phankham Viphavanh
National Assembly President: Pany Yathotou

Events
2017 Asia Rugby Women's Sevens Series

References

External link

 
Years of the 21st century in Laos
Laos
2010s in Laos
Laos